The Omloop van Limburg was a Belgian cycling race organized for the last time in 1969. 

The course, variating between 145 and 258 km, was situated in the Limburg province. Hasselt was both start and finish place, except for 1965 when the race finished in Genk.

The competition's roll of honor includes the successes of Rik Van Steenbergen. The record of victories, however, belongs to Willy Vannitsen.

Winners

References 

Cycle races in Belgium
1941 establishments in Belgium
Defunct cycling races in Belgium
Recurring sporting events established in 1941
Recurring sporting events disestablished in 1969
1969 disestablishments in Belgium